Stemonoporus gracilis is a species of plant in the family Dipterocarpaceae. It is endemic to Sri Lanka.

References

Flora of Sri Lanka
gracilis
Critically endangered plants
Taxonomy articles created by Polbot